In mathematics, more specifically in algebraic geometry, the Griffiths group of a projective complex manifold X measures the difference between homological equivalence and algebraic equivalence, which are two important equivalence relations of algebraic cycles.

More precisely, it is defined as

where  denotes the group of algebraic cycles of some fixed codimension k and the subscripts indicate the groups that are homologically trivial, respectively algebraically equivalent to zero.

References

Algebraic geometry